Thomas Hitzbleck (born 12 March 1947) is a German rower who represented West Germany. He competed at the 1968 Summer Olympics in Mexico City with the men's coxless four where they came sixth. Hitzbleck competed at the 1976 Summer Olympics in Montreal with the men's coxed pair where they came eights.

References

1947 births
Living people
German male rowers
Olympic rowers of West Germany
Rowers at the 1968 Summer Olympics
Rowers at the 1976 Summer Olympics
People from Wilhelmshaven
World Rowing Championships medalists for West Germany
European Rowing Championships medalists
Sportspeople from Lower Saxony